Jim Boyd (January 1, 1956 – June 22, 2016) was a Native American singer-songwriter, actor, and member of The Jim Boyd Band on the Colville Indian Reservation in Washington. Boyd performed in several groups, including XIT, Greywolf, and Winterhawk. Boyd performed four songs with lyrics by Sherman Alexie on the soundtrack for the 1998 movie Smoke Signals, and also appeared in Alexie's, The Business of Fancydancing.

Boyd was a seven-time Award winner of the Native American Music Awards and a Lifetime Achievement Award recipient. He has received multiple nominations and awards for his work from the Native American Music Awards over the years. At the Second Annual Native American Music Awards, he took home the award for Best Compilation Recording for the Smoke Signals soundtrack; at the Fifth Annual Awards, he won Record of the Year for his recording, AlterNatives. The next year he took Best Pop/Rock Recording for Live at the Met; at the Seventh Annual Awards he received Record of the Year for Going to the Stick Games; he received Songwriter of the Year at the Eighth Annual Native American Music Awards for Them Old Guitars; he won Best Short Form Music Video for Inchelium at the Ninth Annual Awards; and he received the prestigious Artist of the Year Award at the Tenth Annual Native American Music Awards.

On November 14, 2014, Boyd was presented with a Lifetime Achievement Award for his outstanding contributions in the field of Native American music at the 15th Annual commemoration held at the Seneca Allegany Casino & Hotel in Salamanca, New York. His wife Shelly and daughter Stevey were both in attendance.

Career
As one of the most highly regarded Native American recording artists, Boyd's music career spanned over four decades in these roles; musician, performer, songwriter, and producer. He has worked on projects for Miramax, Warner Brothers, Mega International Records, Dixiefrog Records, Sound of America Records, as well as produced audio-visual projects for businesses and colleges. Boyd has released 15 records;  Reservation Bound, Unity, Reservation Blues, First Come Last Served, AlterNatives, Jim Boyd w/ Alfonso Kolb Live at the Met, Kyo-ty Live, Going to the Stick Games, Them Old Guitars, Live at Two Rivers, Blues To Bluegrass, Voices From The Lakes, Harley High, Living for the Sunny Days, and most recently Bridge Creek Road.  Boyd also managed his own career and continued to perform as the business owner and operator of his label, Thunderwolf Records. He has toured throughout the United States, Canada, and Europe. He has performed and/or recorded with mainstream artists, such as Bonnie Raitt, The Indigo Girls, Joe Cocker, Joan Baez, and Clint Black, both as a solo artist and with other groups. He appeared at festivals like The New Orleans Jazz & Heritage Festival, Seattle's Bumbershoot, Hard Rock Hotels, The Sundance Film Festival, and appeared on CBS 60 Minutes.

Boyd first started playing gigs in junior high in his older brother's band, The Benzi Kriks, around Sewart Air Force Base in Tennessee. In 1968, the family moved back to the Colville reservation where he continued to play gigs with his lifelong friend Jerry Stensgar, who played bass.  He started playing cover music in bars by the age of sixteen. At the age of 23, Boyd was recruited as a guitar player in the group XIT, which was one of the first rock groups in Indian country to have success. Boyd played for two years with XIT.  Boyd also appeared in the documentary, XIT: Without Reservation, which was a live recording filmed at the Mystic Lake Casino in Prior Lake, Minnesota. Boyd and XIT bass player, Frank Diaz, started a cover group called Greywolf with drummer, Ed Banning. This group continued in many forms throughout the next fifteen years, and eventually added drummer Alfonso Kolb, who continued to play with Boyd afterwards. After Diaz's departure, Jerry Stensgar joined as bass player until Greywolf officially disbanded.

With intentions to become a recording engineer instead of a songwriter, Boyd attended the Recording Workshop in Chillicothe, Ohio in the early 80's.  He didn't start writing his own songs until the age of thirty, penning lyrics about Native American issues placed to contemporary music. He met Sherman Alexie at the Columbia Folk Festival in Spokane, Washington, when Alexie was preparing his first movie, Smoke Signals on Miramax. He asked Boyd to write songs for the soundtrack. The first song he wrote, "Father and Farther," became the movie's central theme. "Music is Jim's voice," Alexie had said. "With his music, he is more courageous, more passionate, more extroverted. He is a gentleman, tender and funny in his private life, and brash and courageous on his public stage. I love them both."

Discography
Boyd had four songs featured in the Miramax motion picture Smoke Signals, which were also included on the TVT Records soundtrack. He also recorded music for Warner Bros. books on tape, Indian Killer.  Not all of Boyd's songs dealt with Native American issues or Native American genres for that matter. His songs ranged from folk to country, rock and blues all while balancing his commercial and artistic sides. A music magazine said he was "a mix of folk, rock, blues, thoughtful lyrics with great guitar riffs and strong vocals". In 2001, Boyd released AlterNatives, which received Record of the Year by the Native American Music Awards. In 2002 and 2003, he released consecutive live releases.  The first was Live At the Met, which was recorded by Boyd and percussionist Alfonso Kolb. The next year he released Kyo-t, LIVE, which was Boyd's four-piece band at that time. In 2004, Boyd produced and performed on sessions with singer-songwriter Robert Richmond. Two of the tracks from these sessions were released in 2013 on Richmond's Before The Night release. In 2005, Boyd released what would win another Record of the Year. This release was called, Going to the Stick Games, which was a tribute to a traditional game that is still played today.  Boyd fused Stick Gamesongs with contemporary music in an Americana vein. He said "although it is a tribute to the Stick Games, it is also a tribute to Hidden Beach, which is on Twin Lakes where I used to play this game when I was younger." Them Old Guitars was released in 2005, of which the title song was a tribute to Boyd's childhood friend and bandmate, Jerry Stensgar. Jerry passed away at the age of fifty. Live at Two Rivers was released in 2006 by the Jim Boyd Band and featured the songs "Inchelium: and "Rebel Moon" which were later released on a compilation recording in France. In 2007, Boyd released Blues to Bluegrass, which was called a "true American gem" and he received Artist of the Year from the Native American Music Awards. In 2010, he recorded and released Voices From The Lakes, a more traditional release featuring cedar flutes, drums, and lyrics that were inspired by the history of the Arrow Lakes People. He released a twelve-song CD which he titled Harley High, in 2011, that was recorded in Nashville and engineered by Grammy award winner Bobby Bradley. Harley High was a mainstream rock recording that portrayed Boyd's love for riding Harley Davidsons.  In April 2013, Boyd re-mastered and re-released, UNITY, originally released in 1993. On March 30, 2015, he released, Bridge Creek Road, featuring an album cover photo of him performing from the last Native American Music Awards ceremony he attended.

Boyd died on June 22, 2016. At the time of his death, he was serving his second term on the Colville Business Council as chairman and was standing for re-election.  He was previously the Culture Committee chairman, Vice-Chairman of the Business Council, and Chairman of the Law & Justice Committee. Boyd is survived by his mother, Violet Boyd, brothers Lanny and Michael, sisters Pam, Luana and LaDonna, his wife Shelly, sons Joel, Dakota, Brian and Michael Carson, daughter Stevey Seymour, and nine grandchildren and one great-grandchild.

References

External links
Thunderwolf Records Official Website

The Native American Music Awards
Seattle Times article on Boyd

1956 births
2016 deaths
American male singer-songwriters
Colville people
Native American musicians
Musicians from Spokane, Washington
Singer-songwriters from Washington (state)